is a Japanese animation studio headquartered in Suginami, Tokyo. Founded in 2011 by Madhouse co-founder and producer Masao Maruyama, it has produced anime works including Terror in Resonance, Yuri!!! on Ice, In This Corner of the World, Kakegurui, Banana Fish, Zombie Land Saga, Dororo (in co-production with Tezuka Productions), Dorohedoro, The God of High School, Jujutsu Kaisen, Attack on Titan: The Final Season, Vinland Saga (season 2), and Chainsaw Man. MAPPA is an acronym for Maruyama Animation Produce Project Association.

Business

History
The studio was established on June 14, 2011, by Masao Maruyama, a co-founder and former producer of Madhouse, at the age of 70. Maruyama served as the company's first representative director, and the studio's initial goal was to produce Sunao Katabuchi's In This Corner of the World. Due to financial difficulties at Madhouse, Maruyama and Katabuchi established MAPPA in the hopes of producing the film; however, despite moving studios, the film had a lot of production troubles, and wasn't released until 5 years later. Maruyama first started working with Katabuchi for the film in 2010 during Madhouse era, but it took three years to start the production due to difficulties to raising funds.

In April 2016, Maruyama resigned as a CEO of the studio and became a chairman. Studio animation producer Manabu Otsuka, a founding member and a former employee of Studio 4°C, became the CEO following Maruyama's official departure.

Criticism
The studio's scheduling, work, and culture have been the subject of intense scrutiny. Veteran animator Hisashi Eguchi criticized the studio's low pay. Mushiyo, another animator at MAPPA, also criticized the company for not properly training its animators and the studio's culture of overwork, which led to them eventually quitting their job at the studio. Besides the animator's individual output within the studio, they also criticized the company's decision to produce four series co-currently. Kevin Cirugeda from Sakugablog suggested the problems were due to the studio's incredibly fast-paced growth and "recklessness".

Cirugeda also noted that in the 20 televised anime MAPPA produced from the beginning of 2015 to the beginning of 2020, the company had only been on the production committee for four of them, all of which listed MAPPA near the bottom or at the very bottom of the list, indicating that they served to a capacity almost as if they were being specifically contracted for work even on "original" series.

Productions

Anime television series

Anime films

Original video animations (OVAs)

Original net animations (ONAs)

Other productions

See also 
List of Japanese animation studios
Grizzly, an animation studio specialized solely on  BL titles

Notes

References

External links 
 
 Company profile 
 

 
Japanese companies established in 2011
Mass media companies established in 2011
Japanese animation studios
Animation studios in Tokyo
Suginami